Peter Shaw (born 6 November 1942) is a British film producer, known for Champions, Keep the Aspidistra Flying, The Water Babies, The Will to Work, and Enigma.

Early life
Shaw was born on 6 November 1942 in Windsor, Berkshire, the son of Thomas William and Margaret Aylwen. He was educated at Eton College, followed by a three-year short service commission in the British Army serving with the Royal Green Jackets.

Career
In 1970 Shaw identified a pressing need for new, up-to-date management training films. Between 1970 and 1973 he produced eight industrial training films, distributed worldwide by the Rank Organisation, winning a Grierson for "The Will to Work"; meanwhile he expanded his film interests. From 1970 to 1980 he co-produced a 12 part TV series Let's Face It and a number of TV documentaries and cinema shorts, including: The World of Miss World, Race for the Double Helix, Maharajahs, Victorians, Display, Sport of Kings, Wind in the Wires.

In 1971 Shaw acquired the screen rights to Nicholas Monsarrat's novel Something to Hide, which went into production in 1972 starring Peter Finch and Shelley Winters, directed by Alistair Reid. In 1975 he teamed up with producer Joseph Shaftel to produce a remake of the 1945 movie The Spiral Staircase directed by Peter Collinson and starring Jacqueline Bisset and Christopher Plummer distributed by Warner Bros. Then in 1978 he produced The Water Babies and Eagles Wing for The Rank Organisation in 1979. In 1982 Shaw produced Enigma in Paris as an Anglo/French co-production; with screenplay by John Briley, directed by Jeannot Szwarc and starring Martin Sheen, Bridget Fosse, Sam Neill.

In 1984 he formed and became CEO of United British Artists Ltd (UBA). Shortly after formation he negotiated "first look" deals for UBA with MGM/UA in Hollywood and with TESE in UK.

In 2017, he acted as executive producer on The Ninth Passenger, which was shot and produced in Canada and which he had previously developed with Lionsgate (UK) in London.

Filmography

Awards

References

External links
 

1942 births
People educated at Eton College
British producers
Living people